Elachista fucosa is a moth of the family Elachistidae. It is found in the dry interior areas of Queensland, New South Wales, South Australia and Western Australia.

The forewings are pale grey and the hindwings are grey.

References

Moths described in 1922
Endemic fauna of Australia
fucosa
Moths of Australia